Classmates is a 1924 American silent drama film starring Richard Barthelmess, produced by his company Inspiration Pictures, and distributed by Associated First National Pictures. The film was directed by John S. Robertson and starred Richard Barthelmess and a still teenaged Madge Evans. The film is based on a popular 1907 play by William C. deMille and Margaret Turnbull.

The play was previously filmed in 1908 and 1914.

Plot
As described in a review in a film magazine, Duncan Irving, Jr. (Barthelmess), son of the village postmaster in a small Carolina town, is admitted to West Point. He is in love with Sylvia Randolph (Evans), whose family are wealthy snobs, and her cousin, Bert (Sheffield), openly insults Duncan. When Duncan is in the graduation class, Bert comes to West Point and resents being ordered about by the upper classmen, especially Duncan, who he considers his social inferior. Finally, he insults Duncan, who strikes him. Feigning blindness, he finally leaves the academy and goes on an expedition in the jungles of South America after giving Sylvia an erroneous account of the fight. Duncan, who has become an engineer, meets Sylvia, who refuses to listen to his explanation and tells him she is engaged to Bert. Word comes that Bert and his companion were lost in the jungle and probably died. To clear himself, Duncan and his pals go to try and rescue Bert. They meet all kinds of hardships, including the desertion of their guides, but are finally rescued by one of the chaps left behind with the supplies. In the meantime, they have found Bert, still unrepentant. All return to the States and when Bert tells the real truth, Duncan is reinstated and when he gets his commission he marries Sylvia at West Point.

Cast

Preservation
With no copies of Classmates located in any film archives, it is a lost film.

References

External links

Still at silenthollywood.com

1924 films
American silent feature films
Films directed by John S. Robertson
American black-and-white films
Silent American drama films
Lost American films
1924 drama films
1924 lost films
Lost drama films
1920s American films